Yiwu is a county-level city under the jurisdiction of Jinhua in Central Zhejiang Province, East China. As of the 2020 census, the city had 1,859,390 inhabitants and its built-up (or metro) area, joined with that of the neighboring Dongyang, was home to 2,947,340 inhabitants. The city is famous for its light industry commodity trade and vibrant market and as a regional tourist destination.

History
Yiwu was founded as Wushang County in 222 BCE, right before the Qin dynasty. It was renamed Yiwu County in 624 CE. Trade has been historically important in Yiwu since the surrounding area has little arable soil. Even before 1600s, Yiwu men would carry sewing needles, threads, sugar chunks and other small commodities in their bamboo baskets, using a shoulder-pole and travel to surrounding rural villages in exchange for chicken feathers. Chicken feathers could be either used as a fertilizer for their own lands or made into feather dusters for exporting. This "Sugar-For-Chicken Feathers" tradition had become part of Yiwu culture. As the trading population grew larger, the earliest wholesale markets emerged in Yiwu around 1700s. After the founding of People's Republic of China in 1949, the free market was once considered capitalistic and hence officially suppressed, forcing Yiwu people to continue their trade secretly. It was only after Deng Xiaoping's economic reform in 1978 did the Yiwu market thrive again, becoming one of the first free marketplaces in PRC's history. The cement boards over a stinky ditch nearby Huqingmen street, set up by the local government as the first marketplace in 1982, later became the present day Yiwu International Trade Mart after 27 years of development. In May 1988 the former Yiwu County was upgraded to a county-level city. In 1995 Yiwu ranked the 47th among China's 100 most powerful counties/cities regarding comprehensive economic strength and in the same year listed as Zhejiang's sole city among the nation's experimental counties/cities of comprehensive reform. In 2001 Yiwu's overall economy ranked 19th of all counties (cities) of China.

Yiwu's early culture has given birth to a number of notable figures in literature, art, military, education and engineering. Among these were Chen Wangdao, China's first translator of the Communist Manifesto; Wu Han, historian and former deputy mayor of Beijing; Zhu Zhixi, the engineer who harnessed the Yellow River; Zhu Danxi, one of the four distinguished doctors of the Jin and Yuan Dynasties; Zong Ze, a well-known general from the Song Dynasty who resisted aggression by the State of Jin; and the ancestors of Wang Leehom, a famous singer.

Geography
The nearest city to Yiwu is Dongyang. The area, as in most of the Province of Zhejiang, is in a mountainous region.

Climate

Administration
Yiwu is part of the greater Municipal region of Jinhua, although it has a distinct urban core. On China's administrative strata it is a sub-prefecture level city. It has under its jurisdiction 15 towns and eight villages, which covers 1,102.8 square kilometres, 100 square kilometres of which are urban area of 700,000 people (2010 estimate). There has been talk of merging the Yiwu and Jinhua areas into a single municipal zone or economic entity, but this plan has yet to make its way into any formal discussion.

The city, in 2020 opened a database for post-2017 domestic violence incidents. According to the All-China Women's Federation, it was the first time a Chinese municipality has enacted such a database. The system was to be launched July 1 that year. The vice president of the Yiwu chapter of the federation, Zhou Danying, stated that in many cases an abusive partner reveals this trait post-marriage. The impetus was an increase in such incidents during the COVID-19 pandemic.

In July 2020, Yiwu became the first city in China to allow residents check their partners' domestic violence records, aimed at reducing incidents of domestic violence.

Administrative divisions
Subdistricts:
Choushan Subdistrict (稠城街道), Beiyuan Subdistrict (北苑街道), Choujiang Subdistrict (稠江街道), Jiangdong Subdistrict (江东街道), Houzhai Subdistrict (后宅街道), Chengxi Subdistrict (城西街道), Niansanli Subdistrict (廿三里街道)

Towns:
Shangxi (上溪镇), Yiting (义亭镇), Fotang (佛堂镇), Chi'an (赤岸镇), Suxi (苏溪镇), Dachen (大陈镇)

Economy

Yiwu is famous in China as a commodities centre. The Yiwu market developed and managed by Zhejiang China Commodities City Group Co., Ltd. (Public, SHA:600415). Yiwu's China Small-Commodity Market has for six consecutive years topped China's 100 top open markets and was for successive years listed as "China's civilized open market". It has been named as the banner of China's market economy and with a large variety of quality but cheaper commodities. There have been a significant increase in Arab traders since the September 11 attacks, as Middle Eastern businessmen found it difficult to travel to the United States due to visa restrictions. The Arab presence has fostered the rise of many mosques and Middle Eastern restaurants.

The GDP reached 52 billion yuan in 2009, an increase of 9% from 2008, and the per capita GDP reached 71,457 yuan (US$10,461). The per capita urban disposable income reached 30,841 yuan and rural pure income 12,899 yuan, increasing 7.4% and 8.5% respectively.

Its 4C-grade airport has over a dozen of air routes to cities including Beijing, Guangzhou, Shantou, Weifang and Shenzhen. The Zhejiang-Jiangxi Railway and Hangzhou-Jinhua Expressway passes through the city, making Yiwu an important local transportation hub. By train it is less than three hours from Shanghai.

"Yiwu, 300 kilometres away from Shanghai, is the largest market of petty commodity wholesales in the world where various foreign buyers go to place orders", according to 'Chinese Figures Astonishing the World', joint report from the United Nations, the World Bank and Morgan Stanley. The city was ranked first among county-level cities In "the 2004 Most Favourite Chinese Cities of Domestic and Foreign Public in 2004".

China Commodity City (CCC), the large wholesale market of Yiwu, was honored by the UN, the World Bank and Morgan Stanley amongst other world authorities in 2005 as the "largest small commodity wholesale market in the world".

The counterfeiting industry has been a problem in Yiwu due to the thriving market. As noted by Eamonn Fingleton, the author of In the Jaws of the Dragon: America's Fate in the Coming Era of Chinese Dominance in 2008, "As documented by the author Tim Phillips in 2005... [t]he city of Yiwu ... functions as a sort of 'Wall Street' for the counterfeiting industry, providing a vast marketplace where, Phillips states, 100,000 counterfeit products are openly traded and 2,000 metric tons of fakes change hands daily."

According to Xinhua, more than 60% of Christmas trinkets worldwide in 2013 came from Yiwu.

Culture

Yiwu contains an Olympic quality stadium. Many events associated with trade take place in Yiwu City. Yiwu also has a sizable Chinese Muslim and Korean population, mostly working in the import and export businesses, as well as a very small Jewish population also in those businesses. It also has a large Christian church and a thousand years old Buddhist temple, Jingju Temple. Yiwu is also known as the "sock town" as annually it produces over three billion pairs of socks for Wal-Mart, Pringle and Disney. Yiwu is also known as China's number one producer of fashion jewellery as firms are based in Yiwu as there are many factories making unbranded jewellery and the amount of warehouses that are available to store the goods in.

The Guyue Bridge, a stone arch bridge built in 1213, is one of the few existing bridges of that era.

This town is the ancestral home of singer Wang Leehom, current Kuomintang leader Eric Chu and the current Chief Executive of Macau Ho Iat Seng.

Education

Colleges and universities
 Yiwu Industrial & Commercial College

High schools
 Yiwu High School
 Yiwu Second Senior High School

Transportation

Rail Freight
Yiwu is the terminal for a number of long-distance international container trains. At 8,111 miles, the Yiwu-Madrid container train route can be viewed as the longest goods railway line in the world. Shipping containers moved along this route travel from China via Kazakhstan, Russia, Belarus, Poland, Germany, France to Spain. In 2016, a similar route was inaugurated connecting Yiwu to Tehran, Iran.

In 2017 a freight train service started operating between Yiwu and Barking Rail Freight Terminal, London, UK.

According to the Yiwu customs office statistics, the total of 65 container trains left the city for Europe and Central/Western Asia in 2015, with 5242 TEU of cargo being imported or exported.

Metro 
Jinhua Metro is a metro currently under construction in Jinhua and Yiwu. It is expected to open in 2021.

Twin towns – sister cities
Yiwu is twinned with:
 Jaworzno, Poland
 Manisa, Turkey
 Orsha, Belarus

See also
 List of twin towns and sister cities in China

References

External links

 Official Yiwu government website
 Official Yiwu government website 
 Yiwu Forum

 
County-level cities in Zhejiang
Geography of Jinhua